Sonam Tshering Venchungpa is an Indian politician. He was elected to the Sikkim Legislative Assembly from Martam-Rumtek in the 2019 by election as a member of the Bharatiya Janata Party.

References

1972 births
Living people
Bharatiya Janata Party politicians from Sikkim
People from Gangtok district
Sikkim MLAs 2019–2024